Yukio Matsumoto (Matsumoto Yukio; * 1944) is a japanese mathematician, who worked mostly in the field of geometric topology and low-dimensional topology. He was a former professor for mathematics at the university of Tokyo.

He received his Ph.D in 1973 from the university of Tokyo and his supervisor was Ichiro Tamura.

In 1984 he won the Iyanaga Prize of the Mathematical Society of Japan.

Selected publications

Books

Solo

Joint

References

External links 
 Curriculum Vitae
 Mathegenealogy

1969 births
Living people
20th-century Japanese mathematicians
21st-century Japanese mathematicians